The Nepalese royal massacre occurred on 1 June 2001 at the Narayanhiti Palace, the then-residence of the Nepalese monarchy. Nine members of the royal family, including King Birendra and Queen Aishwarya, were killed in a mass shooting during a gathering of the royal family at the palace. A government-appointed inquiry team named Crown Prince Dipendra as perpetrator of the massacre. Dipendra slipped into a coma after shooting himself in the head.

Dipendra was declared King of Nepal while comatose after the death of King Birendra. He died in hospital three days after the massacre without regaining consciousness. Birendra's brother Gyanendra then became king.

Events

According to eyewitness reports and an official investigation carried out by a two-man committee made up of Chief Justice Keshav Prasad Upadhyaya and Taranath Ranabhat, the speaker of the House of Representatives concluded:On 1 June 2001, Crown Prince Dipendra opened fire at a house on the grounds of the Narayanhity Palace, the residence of the Nepalese monarchy, where a party was being held. He shot and killed his father, King Birendra, his mother, Queen Aishwarya, and seven other members of the royal family including his younger brother and sister before shooting himself in the head. Due to his wiping out of most of the line of succession, Dipendra became king while in a comatose state from the head wound.Dipendra's motive for the murders is unknown, there are various theories. Dipendra wanted to marry Devyani Rana, whom he had met in the United Kingdom. Some allege that, due to her mother's family being lower-class royal of India and her father's political alliances, the royal family objected. In fact, Devyani's Gwalior family were one of the wealthiest former royal families of India, and allegedly far wealthier than the Nepalese monarchs. The prospective bride's mother warned her daughter that marrying the Nepalese crown prince might mean a drop in her standard of living. Dipendra's prospective bride, chosen by the royal family, was from a competing sub-branch of the Nepalese Rana clan, the Juddha Shamsher line.

Another theory states that there was a higher possibility of Indian influence if Dipendra would be married to Devyani, to which the palace objected. Other theories allege that Dipendra was unhappy with the country's shift from an absolute to a constitutional monarchy, and that too much power had been given away following the 1990 People's Movement. This is, in fact, unlikely. The crown prince responded to the 1990 uprising and return to an elected government with enthusiasm while a student at Eton College, where he was finishing his studies.

Much controversy surrounds the circumstances of the massacre, and even today, with the abolition of the monarchy following the 2006 revolution, many questions remain unresolved. Questions that remain unsolved include: the apparent lack of security at the event; the absence of the Prince Gyanendra, Dipendra's uncle who succeeded him; Dipendra's self-inflicted head-wound located at his left temple, despite being right-handed; and the duration of the subsequent investigation, which lasted for only two weeks and did not involve any major forensic analysis, despite an offer by Scotland Yard to carry one out.

Victims

Killed
King Birendra
Queen Aishwarya
Crown Prince (later king) Dipendra, King Birendra's elder son (perpetrator)
Prince Nirajan, King Birendra's younger son
Princess Shruti, King Birendra's daughter
Prince Dhirendra, King Birendra's younger brother, who had renounced his title
Princess Shanti, King Birendra's eldest sister, also Rani of Bajhang
Princess Sharada, King Birendra's middle sister
 Kumar Khadga, Princess Sharada's husband
Princess Jayanti, King Birendra's first cousin, and sister of Mrs. Ketaki Chester

Wounded
Princess Shova, King Birendra's youngest sister
Kumar Gorakh, Princess Shruti's husband
Princess Komal, Prince Gyanendra's wife and last Queen of Nepal
Ketaki Chester, King Birendra's first cousin, who had renounced her title (and middle sister of Princess Jayanti)

Aftermath
The following day, the members of the Royal Family were cremated. Dipendra was proclaimed king while comatose but died on 4 June 2001. Gyanendra was appointed regent for the three days, and then ascended the throne himself after the death of Dipendra.
 
When Dipendra was unconscious, Gyanendra maintained that the deaths were the result of an "accidental discharge of an automatic weapon" within the royal palace. Later, he said that he made this claim due to "legal and constitutional hurdles" since under the constitution and by tradition, Dipendra could not have been charged with murder had he survived. A full investigation took place and Dipendra was found responsible for the killing.
 
A two-man committee comprising Chief Justice Keshav Prasad Upadhaya and Speaker of the House Taranath Ranabhat carried out a week-long investigation concerning the massacre. The investigation concluded, after interviewing more than a hundred people including eyewitnesses and palace officials, guards, and staff, that Dipendra was the perpetrator of the shooting. However, observers both inside Nepal and abroad disputed Dipendra's culpability in the incident.

The massacre added to the political turmoil caused by the Maoist insurgency. Following the ascension of Gyanendra, the monarchy lost much of the approval of the Nepalese populace. Some say this massacre was the pivotal point that ended the monarchy in Nepal.

On 12 June 2001, a Hindu katto ceremony was held to exorcise or banish the spirit of the dead king from Nepal. A Hindu priest, Durga Prasad Sapkota, dressed as Birendra to symbolise the late king, rode an elephant out of Kathmandu and into symbolic exile, taking many of the monarch's belongings with him.

Dipendra's residence was eventually razed.

Conspiracy theories
King Birendra and his son Dipendra were very popular and well-respected by the Nepalese population. On the day of the massacre, Gyanendra was in Pokhara whilst other royals were attending the dinner function. His wife Komal, their son Paras, and their daughter Prerana were in the room at the royal palace during the massacre. While the entire families of Birendra and Dipendra were killed, nobody in Gyanendra's family died: his son escaped with slight injuries, and his wife sustained a life-threatening bullet wound but survived. This gave rise to conspiracy theories.

Pushpa Kamal Dahal (Prachanda), the chairman of the Nepalese Maoist Party, in a public gathering claimed that the massacre was planned by the Indian Research and Analysis Wing (R&AW) or the American Central Intelligence Agency (CIA). Since the massacre, some eyewitness statements have been released such as, "multiple people with the mask of the Crown Prince Dipendra were present in the room at one point." The bodies of some of the Royal Family members were found elsewhere in the palace and not the dining hall, whereas Dipendra was cited as one of the first ones to have been shot. There is a book titled "Raktakunda" based on interviews of two palace maids which details these theories. Promoters of these ideas alleged Gyanendra had a hand in the massacre so that he could assume the throne himself. His ascent to the throne would have been possible only if both of his nephews, Dipendra and Nirajan, were removed from the line of succession. Moreover, Gyanendra and his son Prince Paras were very unpopular. One of the eyewitness of the royal massacre, Lal Bahadur Magar, claims that Paras is the main man behind the whole massacre. Magar was one of the bodyguards of Crown Prince Dipendra at that time.

Claims such as: that the perpetrator was not Dipendra but an individual who wore a mask to disguise himself as Dipendra; that Paras broke and threw away Dipendra's ventilator in hospital; that 900 were killed in the palace that night and the purpose of the curfews was to allow the disposal of their bodies; that the public water supply and milk had been poisoned in Kathmandu, etc., have circulated in Nepalese media. Conspiracy theories have also blamed Ketaki Chester, Upendra Devkota, or the Nepalese army for the massacre. However, no reliable evidence have been found for these claims.

In popular culture
Murder Most Royal or Nepal: Murder Most Royal is a 2002 documentary by Donna Sharpe produced for the BBC and aired on BBC2. It details the reasons for Dipendra perpetrating the massacre, including his forbidden marriage with Devyani Rana.
Super Star (also released as Stupid), a 2002 Indian film loosely based on the love story of Dipendra of Nepal and Devyani Rana, and the Nepalese royal massacre.
The massacre is featured in the third season of the documentary series Zero Hour, based on a reconstruction of the event taken from surviving eyewitnesses.
 The back story of Pagan Min, the main antagonist of the game Far Cry 4 (Ubisoft, 2012), which takes place in the fictional (but based on Nepal) kingdom of Kyrat seems to refer to this event in a modified version.

Bibliography 
 Garzilli, Enrica, "A Sanskrit Letter Written by Sylvain Lévi in 1923 to Hemarāja Śarmā Along With Some Hitherto Unknown Biographical Notes (Cultural Nationalism and Internationalism in the First Half of the 21st Cent.: Famous Indologists Write to the Raj Guru of Nepal – no. 1)", in Commemorative Volume for 30 Years of the Nepal-German Manuscript Preservation Project. Journal of the Nepal Research Centre, XII (2001), Kathmandu, ed. by A. Wezler in collaboration with H. Haffner, A. Michaels, B. Kölver, M. R. Pant and D. Jackson, pp. 115–149.
 Garzilli, Enrica, "Strage a palazzo, movimento dei Maoisti e crisi di governabilità in Nepal", in Asia Major 2002, pp. 143–160.
 Garzilli, Enrica, "A Sanskrit Letter Written by Sylvain Lévy in 1925 to Hemarāja Śarmā along with Some Hitherto Unknown Biographical Notes (Cultural Nationalism and Internationalism in the First Half of the 20th Century – Famous Indologists write to the Raj Guru of Nepal – No. 2)", in History of Indological Studies. Papers of the 12th World Sanskrit Conference Vol. 11.2, ed. by K. Karttunen, P. Koskikallio and A. Parpola, Motilal Banarsidass and University of Helsinki, Delhi 2015, pp. 17–53.

See also

List of massacres in Nepal
2009 attack on the Dutch royal family
Murder of the Romanov family

References

External links
Trapped in tradition (Frontline: India's National Magazine)
Eyewitness Statements
 Synopsis of the Investigation Committee's report. Wall Street Journal.

2001 in Nepal
2001 crimes in Nepal
21st century in Kathmandu
2001 suicides
Conspiracy theories in Asia

History of Nepal (1951–2008)
June 2001 events in Asia
June 2001 crimes
Kingdom of Nepal
Massacres in 2001
Massacres in Nepal
Mass shootings in Asia
Monarchy
Murder–suicides in Asia
Nepalese royalty
Regicides
Spree shootings in Nepal
Familicides
2000s murders in Nepal
2001 murders in Asia